Kispus is a 1956 Danish romantic comedy film written and directed by Erik Balling. The film was the first Danish feature movie to be filmed in colour.

Synopsis 
The eccentric fashion designer Mr. Marcel gives his newly designed gown to the common working-class seamstress, Eva, when he sees how well it fits her. He then bets the actress who originally ordered the gown that if Eva wears his creation to an upcoming movie premiere, she will be accepted as a high-society woman. He is right and Eva attracts the young aristocrat Jakob. Eva fears that Jakob will discover her lowly background, but Jakob himself is a fraud. He is only a poor student who works as a chauffeur and sells his books to take her out. After numerous misunderstandings and complications, love wins out over snobbery and fraud.

Cast 
 Helle Virkner as Eva Møller, seamstress
 Henning Moritzen as Jakob, student
  as Hr. Marcel, fashion designer
 Nina Pens Rode as Elizabeth, primadonna
 Gunnar Lauring as Carl, Elizabeth's husband
 Ove Sprogøe as Max, waiter, Eva's brother
 Lis Løwert  as Joan, Max's wife
 Inger Lassen as Jokum, Mr. Marcel's agent
 Gerda Madsen as Mrs. Knudsen, Jakob's landlady
 Poul Reichhardt as An actor
 Margaretha Fahlén as Actor's wife
 Birgitte Federspiel as Dora, Society Lady
 Vera Gebuhr as Ida, actress
 Jessie Rindom as Society Lady
 Bjørn Watt-Boolsen as Svend, writer
 Lily Broberg as Svend's ex-wife

References

External links 
 
 

1956 films
1956 romantic comedy films
1950s Danish-language films
Films directed by Erik Balling
Films with screenplays by Erik Balling
Danish romantic comedy films